Westwood is a village in west St. Louis County, Missouri, United States. The population was 278 at the 2010 census.

Geography
Westwood is located at  (38.640619, -90.434286).

Demographics

2020 census
As of the 2020 census there were 316 people and 116 households living in the village. The racial makeup of the village was 80.7% White, 3.2% African American, 10.8% Asian, 0.3% from other races, and 4.7% from two or more races. Hispanic or Latino of any race were 5.1% of the population.

2010 census
At the 2010 census there were 278 people, 120 households, and 88 families living in the village. The racial makeup of the village was 92.1% White, 2.2% African American, 3.6% Asian, 0.7% from other races, and 1.4% from two or more races. Hispanic or Latino of any race were 2.2%.

Of the 120 households 23.3% had children under the age of 18 living with them, 67.5% were married couples living together, 3.3% had a female householder with no husband present, 2.5% had a male householder with no wife present, and 26.7% were non-families. 21.7% of households were one person and 12.5% were one person aged 65 or older. The average household size was 2.32 and the average family size was 2.66.

The median age in the village was 53.9 years. 16.5% of residents were under the age of 18; 5.1% were between the ages of 18 and 24; 12.9% were from 25 to 44; 38.8% were from 45 to 64; and 26.6% were 65 or older. The gender makeup of the village was 47.5% male and 52.5% female.

2000 census
At the 2000 census there were 284 people, 120 households, and 93 families living in the village. The racial makeup of the village was 95.77% White, 3.17% African American and 1.06% Asian.
Of the 120 households 28.3% had children under the age of 18 living with them, 75.0% were married couples living together, 0.8% had a female householder with no husband present, and 22.5% were non-families. 20.0% of households were one person and 14.2% were one person aged 65 or older. The average household size was 2.37 and the average family size was 2.72.

The age distribution was 21.1% under the age of 18, 1.1% from 18 to 24, 17.6% from 25 to 44, 36.3% from 45 to 64, and 23.9% 65 or older. The median age was 50 years. For every 100 females, there were 101.4 males. For every 100 females age 18 and over, there were 86.7 males.

The median household income was $119,618 and the median family income  was $144,381. Males had a median income of $100,000 versus $32,250 for females. The per capita income for the village was $80,990. None of the families and 0.7% of the population were living below the poverty line, including no one under 18 and 2.1% of those over 64.

References

Villages in St. Louis County, Missouri
Villages in Missouri